Pardoxia graellsii, the yellow drab, is a moth species in the family Nolidae first described by Joachim François Philibert Feisthamel in 1837. It is found in France, Spain, Turkey, Iraq, China, India, Myanmar, Cape Verde, the Comoros, Ethiopia, Ghana, Réunion, Madagascar, Malawi, Mauritania, Mauritius, Nigeria, Saudi Arabia, Sierra Leone, South Africa, the Gambia, Yemen and Zimbabwe.

Larvae have been recorded feeding on Althaea officinalis, Lavatera olbia and Gossypium species.

References

External links
10453 "Pardoxia graellsii (Feisthamel, 1837)". Lepiforum e. V. Retrieved August 3, 2020. 

Chloephorinae
Moths of Europe
Moths of Asia
Moths of Africa